The Kobi Line is an electrified railway line of the Korean State Railway in P'yŏngyang and in North Hwanghae Province, North Korea, running from Ripsŏngri on the P'yŏngdŏk Line to Kobi, with a branch to Namsan.

History
The Kobi Line, together with Ripsŏngri Station, were opened by the Chosen Government Railway on 1 November 1934.

Route 

A yellow background in the "Distance" box indicates that section of the line is not electrified.

References

Railway lines in North Korea
Standard gauge railways in North Korea